Dominik Hrbatý (born 4 January 1978) is a former Slovak professional tennis player. Hrbatý reached the semifinals of the 1999 French Open, and achieved a career-high singles ranking of world No. 12 in October 2005. Hrbatý is one of only three players, alongside Nick Kyrgios and Lleyton Hewitt, to have beaten each member of the Big Three (Novak Djokovic, Roger Federer, and Rafael Nadal) the first time he played each of them.

Hrbatý is one of a select few players to have competed on the ATP Tour with a positive winning record against Federer (2–1), Nadal (3–1), Murray (1–0), and Berdych (1–0 in ATP-level matches, or 2–0 overall). Hrbatý's record against Djokovic stands at 1–1 (or 0–1 at tour-level events). Hrbaty, Alex Corretja and Novak Djokovic are the only players to have a winning record over Roger Federer and Rafael Nadal.

Personal life
Hrbatý was born on 4 January 1978 in Bratislava, Czechoslovakia. His father was an architecture engineer and his younger brother is an umpire. When he was younger, Hrbatý was European junior competitor in skiing and from the age of 11, he focused on tennis full-time.

He is married to Nelly Petrová; he proposed after Slovakia won the Hopman Cup on 10 January 2009 (with Dominika Cibulková).
He also won the tournament for Slovakia in 2005 with Daniela Hantuchová. This makes Hrbatý a dual winner to move into the company of Serena Williams, James Blake, Tommy Robredo and Arantxa Sánchez Vicario.

Tennis career
Hrbatý turned professional in 1996. During the year he reached six Challenger finals and achieved a 35–15 match record. He ended the year as the youngest player in the top 100.

In 1997, Hrbatý won the Košice Challenger title defeating Nicolás Lapentti. He also reached his first ATP Tour final in Palermo, losing to Alberto Berasategui. His first doubles success on the Tour was reaching the final of Umag with Karol Kučera.

Hrbatý broke through for his first ATP title in 1998 in San Marino and defended his title in Košice. He continued his form into 1999 capturing his second title in Prague. His greatest breakthrough was reaching the semi-finals of Roland Garros where he defeated Julien Boutter, Yevgeny Kafelnikov, Andrew Ilie, Marat Safin and Marcelo Ríos before falling to eventual winner, Andre Agassi.

Despite not winning a title in 2000, Hrbatý reached three finals in Monte Carlo, St. Petersburg and Brighton. During the year he helped Slovakia win the ATP World Team Championship where he had wins over Pete Sampras and Kafelnikov. While not winning a title in singles, he won the Rome Masters doubles title with Martin Damm and reached another three finals.

2001 got off to a quick start for Hrbatý, winning in Auckland for his third ATP title, defeating at the final the Spaniard Francisco Clavet. He backed up that win with a quarter-finals appearance at the Australian Open. On his way he defeated number two seed, Marat Safin. Other notable singles results were reaching the semi-finals in Dubai, Tashkent and Moscow. Hrbatý helped Slovakia back into the World Group stage in Davis Cup by defeating Nicolás Massú and Rios in 5 sets coming from two sets down in each match. Hrbatý teamed up with Roger Federer in the men's doubles at the Australian Open in 2001. However they were knocked out by Thomas Shimada and Myles Wakefield.

Hrbatý had an average year in 2002 where he finished out of the top 50 for the first time since 1996. He won a Challenger title in Biella. In 2003, Hrbatý made the final in Auckland losing to Gustavo Kuerten. Also made the semi-finals in Casablanca and Umag. Defeated Andy Roddick in the Davis Cup to end the American's 19-match winning streak.

Hrbatý's best season in his career to date was in 2004. He started the season with back-to-back title wins in Auckland and Adelaide. The Auckland victory was over Rafael Nadal in the final. Then won his sixth career title in Marseille and then made it to the final in Casablanca. He achieved one of his best wins by defeating World No. 1 Roger Federer in Cincinnati and then made it to the quarter-finals of the US Open.

In 2005, Hrbatý finished in the top 20 despite not reaching a singles final. His best results were semi-finals in Los Angeles, Metz and Basel. He had good success in the ATP Masters Series in Miami, Rome and Montreal, where he reached the quarter-finals.

Also in 2005, Hrbatý helped Slovakia reach the Davis Cup final against Croatia. He compiled a 6–1 singles record during the season. Inflicted Ivan Ljubičić's only singles loss in the final but Slovakia lost the final 2–3.

2006 was a mixed year for Hrbatý. He reached his second Tennis Masters Series title final in Paris losing to Nikolay Davydenko, which helped him finish in the top 25 in the year-end rankings. Other results were semi-finals in Los Angeles and Vienna and a quarter-finals in Beijing.

Hrbatý's form started to drop in 2007. He was plagued by an elbow injury which severely limited his play in that season.

At the 2007 U.S. Open, in doubles, he lost to Jesse Levine and Alex Kuznetsov, while pairing with Harel Levy of Israel, 6–1, 6–4.

At the 2008 Wimbledon Championships, Hrbatý lost to his good friend and former doubles partner Federer in the first round, 6–3, 6–2, 6–2. Hrbatý sat immediately next to Federer and had an amicable conversation with him during the last changeover of the match, telling Federer that this may be Hrbatý's last Wimbledon and that, as a joke, this has been the first victory for Federer in a match against him and leads him 2–1 in head to head.

In 2010, Hrbaty announced his retirement as he became a father for the first time.
In 2012, Hrbaty temporarily returned to professional tennis by playing in the qualifying tournament for the 2012 Heineken Open. He won his first round of qualifying by beating Pere Riba in straight sets 6–4, 6–2.

Major finals

ATP Masters 1000 finals

Singles: 2 (0–2)

Doubles: 1 (1–1)

Career finals

Singles: 13 (6–7)

Performance timeline

Singles

Top 10 wins

Notes

References

External links
 
 
 
 Hrbaty world ranking history 
 
 
 

1978 births
Hopman Cup competitors
Living people
Slovak male tennis players
Slovak expatriates in Monaco
Olympic tennis players of Slovakia
Tennis players at the 2000 Summer Olympics
Tennis players at the 2004 Summer Olympics
Tennis players at the 2008 Summer Olympics
Tennis players from Bratislava
People from Monte Carlo